Kishan Singh (born 1931) is an Indian plant pathologist, known for his contributions to the pathology of crops, especially sugarcane. An alumnus of the Chandra Shekhar Azad University of Agriculture and Technology, he is reported to have done seminal research on the epidemiology and control of sugarcane diseases and suggested disease management through hot air therapy. He has published his research findings by way of articles and books, which include Soil fungicides (2 volumes), Recent advances in plant pathology,
The national research grid for sugarcane in India, Sugarcane diseases and prospects of their control, Diseases of sugarbeet in India, Grassy shoot disease of sugarcane : III: response of varieties to infection, Innovations in companion cropping with sugarcane and Laminar infection of sugarcane leaves by red rot (Physalospora tucumanensis) organism in nature. The Council of Scientific and Industrial Research, the apex agency of the Government of India for scientific research, awarded him the Shanti Swarup Bhatnagar Prize for Science and Technology, one of the highest Indian science awards, in 1976, for his contributions to biological sciences.

See also 
 Plant pathology
 List of sugarcane diseases

References

External links 
 

Recipients of the Shanti Swarup Bhatnagar Award in Biological Science
20th-century Indian biologists
Indian phytopathologists
Indian scientific authors
1931 births
Living people